Tospitis is a genus of moths in the subfamily Arctiinae.

Species
 Tospitis brunneiplaga Hampson, 1918
 Tospitis nulliferana Walker, 1863

References

Natural History Museum Lepidoptera generic names catalog

Lithosiini
Moth genera